John Russell (died 30 December 1494) was an English Bishop of Rochester and bishop of Lincoln and Lord Chancellor.

Life
Russell was admitted to Winchester College in 1443, and in 1449 went to Oxford as Fellow of New College. He resigned his fellowship in 1462, and appears to have entered the royal service.

He was appointed Archdeacon of Berkshire and served from 1466 to 1476.

In April 1467 and January 1468 Russell was employed on diplomatic missions for Edward IV of England to Charles the Bold, at Bruges. He was there again in February 1470 as one of the envoys to invest Charles with the Order of the Garter: the Latin speech which Russell delivered on this last occasion was one of William Caxton's earliest publications, probably printed for him at Bruges by Colard Mansion.

In May 1474 Russell was promoted to be Lord Privy Seal, and retained his office even after his consecration as bishop of Rochester on 22 September 1476, and translation to the post of bishop of Lincoln on 7 July 1480.

As a trusted minister of Edward IV, Russell was one of the executors of the king's will. After Lord Chancellor Thomas Rotherham, Archbishop of York, had been dismissed due to his mishandling of the great seal, Russell was appointed to succeed him on 13 May 1483. Reportedly, Russell accepted the appointment only with reluctance. He remained chancellor under King Richard III until being dismissed on 29 July 1485.

Russell was above all things an official, and was sometimes employed by Henry VII in public affairs. But his last years were occupied chiefly with the business of his diocese, and of the university of Oxford, of which he had been elected chancellor in 1483. He died at Nettleham, and was buried at Lincoln Cathedral.

Sir Thomas More called Russell "a wise manne and a good, and of much experience, and one of the best-learned men, undoubtedly, that England had in hys time." Two English speeches composed by Russell, for the intended parliament of Edward V, and the first parliament of Richard III, are printed in Nichols's Grants of Edward V. Some other writings remain in manuscript.

Citations

References
 

Year of birth missing
1494 deaths
Archdeacons of Berkshire
Bishops of Rochester
Bishops of Lincoln
15th-century English Roman Catholic bishops
Chancellors of the University of Oxford
Lords Privy Seal
Lord chancellors of England